Kreislauf is a German netlabel and radio show focusing on quality electronic dance music and ambient music in many flavours (house, techno, breakbeat, etc.).

History 
Kreislauf recommend and publish electronic music beyond commerce and drawers. The project was founded by Andreas Buttweiler and Thomas Hentrich in 1997 as an Ambient-Club in Mannheim/Germany.

In the year 2000 they started their weekly radio-show "Kreislauf. FM" at the free radio-stadion Bermudafunk in Mannheim and Heidelberg, and since 2004 also at Tide 96.0 in Hamburg.

The Label-Section was founded in 2001 by Dirk Hartmann (label-owner of Hörzu!) and Andreas Buttweiler, and become a netlabel in 2006.

Kreislauf 016 was not released.

Artists

Releases

Kreislauf 

 Kreislauf 081 - Josh Winiberg "Game Over"
 Kreislauf 062 - Hug A Turtle Today ":hel"
 Kreislauf 061 - Labkopp "Labkopp LP"

Kreislauf Extra

Kreislauf Kommerz 
 Kommerz 01 - Tails "Tripbrett EP"

See also
 List of record labels

External links
 Website
 Kreislauf @ Myspace
 Kreislauf @ Discogs

Creative Commons-licensed works
Electronic dance music record labels
German independent record labels
Hip hop record labels
House music record labels
Online music stores of Germany
Indie rock record labels
Netlabels
Record labels established in 2001
Techno record labels